The Action between the USS Boston and Berceau, was a single ship action off Guadeloupe, during the Quasi-War with France.  (32 guns), Capt. George Little, captured the French corvette , capitaine de frégate Louis-André Senez. Cruising 600 miles northeast of Guadeloupe in the morning of 12 October, Boston, spotted two vessels that by 8:00 A.M. were determined to be warships, a schooner (not identified) and the 24-gun Berceau, which then headed in different directions. 

Pursuing the latter, Boston gained steadily before catching her in the late afternoon (the American report gives the time as 4:30 P.M., French 3:30 P.M.). Berceau then shortened sail and the two began a stubborn engagement, each trying to wreck the spars, sails and rigging of the other until the damage to the tops of both made them unmanageable and they drifted apart. The crews then spent the next several hours repairing their damage so that they could rejoin the fight. Well after dusk, the two were again able to engage (the French report gives an additional intermediate engagement), which they did for more than an hour. The action was finally terminated (American, 10:20 P.M.; French 11:30 P.M.) when, losing her fore and main mast and already having had boarding attempts repulsed, Berceau was forced to strike her colors.

Following several days spent immobile, repairing spars, sails and rigging, Boston towed Berceau under prize-master Robert Haswell to its namesake home port of Boston. On arrival, it was discovered that the action had actually been fought two weeks after a peace agreement had formally ended hostilities. As a consequence Berceau was repaired at American expense and returned to France. The victory was also tainted by charges that the French officers had been plundered of their personal belongings and negro servants, with the active participation of most of their American counterparts. Acquitted in a resulting court martial proceeding, most of Bostons officers were nonetheless dismissed from the Navy.

References
 James Truslow Adams, Dictionary of American History, Charles Scribner's Sons, New York, 1940
 Frederick C. Leiner, Millions for Defense: The Subscription Warships of 1798, Naval Institute Press, Annapolis, 1999

Naval battles of the Quasi-War
Conflicts in 1800
1800 in France
1800 in the United States